K-433 Svyatoy Georgiy Pobedonosets (St. George the Victorious) is a Russian Project 667BDR Kalmar class (NATO reporting name: Delta III) nuclear-powered ballistic missile submarine. The submarine was built for the Soviet Navy and has continued to serve in the Russian Navy. K-433 was put in reserve in 1997 and remained there until 2004 when it was recommissioned. , it is on active duty.

The submarine is slated to be retired and replaced by the Borei class submarine in the coming years.

On October 28, 2010 the submarine carried out a successful R-29R missile test.
The submarine sustained minor damage when a fishing vessel collided with it on September 22, 2011.

References

Delta-class submarines
Ships built in the Soviet Union
1980 ships
Cold War submarines of the Soviet Union
Submarines of Russia
Ships built by Sevmash